John Percy "Perc" or "Perce" Horne (1890–1990) was an Australian rugby league footballer who played in the 1910s and 1920s.

Background
Horner was born at Waterloo, New South Wales on 16 September 1890.

Playing career
Horne played rugby league from childhood, in the South's junior league. He was graded at Souths in the clubs pioneering years of the 1910s and played first grade during the 1919, 1923 and 1924 seasons. 

Horne played in the grand final for South Sydney in 1923. He played his final season at Newtown in 1925.

Post playing
Horne was known as the 'grand old man' of the South Sydney Rabbitohs club. He was the honorary-secretary of Souths reserve grade team for 47 years before his retirement in 1973. Perc was made a life member of South Sydney Rabbitohs in 1961, and he became the longest serving district official in NSWRFL history.

Death
Horne died at a nursing home at Cronulla, New South Wales on 21 January 1990, in his 100th year.

References

1890 births
1990 deaths
Australian rugby league players
Australian rugby league administrators
South Sydney Rabbitohs players
Newtown Jets players
Rugby league second-rows
Rugby league players from Sydney